Stiphrometasia petryi is a moth in the family Crambidae. It is found in Israel and the Palestinian territories.

References

Cybalomiinae
Moths described in 1935